The Thessaloniki Urban Transport Organisation, abbreviated OASTH, is a mass transport company  operating in Thessaloniki, Greece.

It was founded in 1957 and now covers a large area of the metropolitan area of Thessaloniki, the country's second-largest city. OASTH only includes bus transportation due to lack of other means of transport.

History

Before the creation of OASTH in 1957, public transport in Thessaloniki was initially covered by an extensive tram network opened in the late 19th century. Later a Belgian bus company started operating with horse-pulled carriages seating 4 to 5 people. OASTH was founded by Presidential Decree 3721 and aimed at replacing the city's tram network as sole provider of public transport. The initial fleet included 283 buses of 60 to 80 seats.

In 1978, OASTH acquired the first articulated buses in Greece. In 1979 OASTH expands, taking over several routes previously operated by KTEL in the suburbs of Thessaloniki and also takes over the sea services operating by small boats during summer months and are replaced by new OASTH bus routes.

In 2003 OASTH expanded again and 12 new lines were created for the suburbs of Thessaloniki. In 2009 64 new buses were added to the fleet, numbering 604 buses in total. The agreement with the Greek state regarding the right to monopolise public transport in Thessaloniki is valid until two years after the completion of the Thessaloniki Metro and its expansions.

The Greek government in 2017, through the passing of a law, proceeded to nationalize the company in 2017, citing as a cause the poor service of the citizens, the corruption and the complaints for embezzlement of public money by the private shareholders.

Lines in operation 
Being the sole provider of public transport within the city of Thessaloniki, OASTH operates an extensive network that covers the entire city. Overall 75 routes are currently in service. Several bus stops all over Thessaloniki are equipped with electronic timetables notifying passengers about the arrival of the next bus of every line.

Vehicles 
The current fleet of OASTh consists of the following bus types:

 Sarakakis Alexandros (Volvo B10MA) (1998-)
 ELVO C93.113CLL (Scania L113CLL) (1998-)
 Irisbus Europolis (2003-)
 Irisbus CityClass (2004-)
 Mercedes-Benz CitaroG (2006-)
 ELVO C05.B7L-11M (Volvo B7L)
 ELVO C04.B7LA (Volvo B7LA)
 Sarakakis Makedonia (Volvo B7RLE)

 ELVO C03.B7L (Volvo B7L) (2006-)
 ELVO C06.B9LA (Volvo B9LA) (2007-)
 Mercedes-Benz Citaro (2009-)
 ELVO C08.B9L (Volvo B9L) (2010-)
 ELVO C08.B9LA (Volvo B9LA) (2010-)
 Irisbus Citelis 12 (2010-)
 Mercedes-Benz Sprinter City 35 (2010-)

See also
Thessaloniki Metro
Transport in Greece

External links
 Oasth - Official Site

References

Bus companies of Greece
Transport in Thessaloniki
Organizations established in 1957